Daniel Collins, Danny Collins, or Dan Collins may refer to:

Daniel Collins
 Daniel Collins (canoeist) or Danny Collins (born 1970), Australian Olympic canoeist
 Daniel Collins (Dark Shadows), a character in Dark Shadows
 Daniel Collins (actor, artist, custom car and motorcycle builder) (born 1974), American actor in the movie The Stoned Age, TV show Northern Exposure and others
 Daniel Collins (priest) (died 1648), Canon of Windsor
 Daniel Collins (hurler) (born 1994), Irish hurler
 Daniel J. Collins (died 1926), New York assemblyman
 Daniel P. Collins (born 1963), American lawyer and federal judge

Danny Collins
 Danny Collins (film), 2015 comedy-drama film
 Danny Collins (footballer) (born 1980), Welsh footballer
 Danny Boy Collins (born 1967), English wrestler

Dan Collins
 Dan Collins (actor, artist, custom car and motorcycle builder) (born 1974) See: Daniel Collins (actor)
 Dan Collins (American football) (born 1976), American football player
 Dan Collins (baseball) (1854–1883), baseball player
 Dan Collins (journalist), senior producer for CBSNews.com
 Dan Collins (footballer) (1872–1925), played Australian football for St. Kilda in the VFL